Agra Fort railway station, is located near Agra Fort, in Rawatpara, Agra. It used to be one of the stations in India that had both broad gauge and metre gauge, until the line to Jaipur was converted to broad gauge. Agra Fort railway station comes under the North Central Railways.

Overview
Agra, the 16-17th century capital of the Mughals, is home to monuments such as the Taj Mahal and Agra Fort. The Taj Mahal attracts 7–8 million tourists annually. About 0.8 million foreign tourists visit it.

History
The -wide metre-gauge Delhi–Bandikui and Bandikui–Agra lines of Rajputana State Railway were opened in 1874. The Agra–Jaipur line was converted to  broad gauge in 2005.

There was a spacious, octagonal Tripolia Chowk which existed between the Jama Masjid and the Delhi gate of the Agra Fort. This Tripolia was destroyed in order to create the Agra Fort railway station, which was also the first railway station of Agra and also one of the oldest in the country.

Electrification
The Faridabad–Mathura–Agra section was electrified in 1982–85, Tundla–Yamuna Bridge in 1988–89 and Yamuna Bridge–Agra in 1990–91.

Passengers
Agra Fort railway station serves around 87,000 passengers every day.

Amenities
Agra Fort railway station has a telephone booth, a waiting room, a refreshment room, water coolers and a book stall.

Taxis, auto-rickshaws and cycle-rickshaws are available for local movement. The Taj Mahal 3.8 km, the Agra Fort 0.9 km, the Sikandra 10.4 km, the Mankameshwar Temple 0.15 km, the Fatehpur Sikri 38 km, and the Agra Airport 3.8 km.

Gallery

See also

Railways in Agra

References

External links

Railway stations in Agra
Agra railway division
1874 establishments in India
Railway stations opened in 1874